Diagrams and Explanations of the Wonderful Machines of the Far West (Chinese: Yuǎn xī qí qì túshuō lù zuì, 遠西奇器圖說錄最, often abridged as Qí qì túshuō, 奇器圖說) was an encyclopedia of Western mechanical devices translated into Chinese by the Jesuit Johann Schreck (1576-1630), and the Chinese scholar Wang Zheng (王徵 1571–1644). This book was the first to present Western mechanical knowledge to a Chinese audience. The book was published in 1627.

Particularly, the works of the Italian engineers Agostino Ramelli or Vittorio Zonca were reproduced in this translation, as well as those of the French engineer Jacques Besson. Plates depicting European machine were reproduced quite precisely, although in a Chinese pictorial style.

See also 
 Jesuit China missions

References

Citations

Sources 
 Zhang Baichun, 'An Inquiry into the History of the Chinese Terms Jiqi (Machines) and Jixie (Machinery)', in Michael Lackner et al., New Terms for New Ideas: Western Knowledge and Lexical Change in Late Imperial China BRILL, 2001 
 Brian Scott Baigrie Picturing Knowledge: Historical and Philosophical Problems Concerning the Use of Art in Science University of Toronto Press, 1996 
 Joseph Needham, Ling Wang, Gwei-Djen Lu Science and civilisation in China Cambridge University Press, 1965 

Chinese encyclopedias
1627 books
History of science and technology in China
Engineering books